Hitler bell (Hitler-Glocke, Führer-Glocke, Nazi-Glocke) are bells decorated with Nazi ornamentations or texts. The Evangelical Church in Germany had 22 such bells in 2020.

Germany
 Essingen, Ostalbkreis, Rheinland-Pfalz
 Faßberg, DIstrict of Celle, Niedersachsen; Michaelkirche, Faßberg)
 Hakenfelde, Berlin-Spandau; Wichernkirche, Berlin-Hakenfelde
 Herxheim am Berg, District Bad Dürkheim, Rheinland-Pfalz; after a fire in August 1934, the church was sent three replacement bells, one of which was dedicated to Hitler. It bears a swastika and the inscription "ALL FOR THE FATHERLAND - ADOLF HITLER" ("ALLES FUER'S VATERLAND - ADOLF HITLER"). The local council voted to keep it as memorial. The bell was originally non-clerical, an alarm bell (Polizeiglocke).
 Mehlingen, District of Kaiserslautern, Rheinland-Pfalz
 Rilchingen-Hanweiler, Kleinblittersdorf, District of Saarbrücken, Saarland
 Schweringen, District Nienburg/Weser, Niedersachsen; Kreuz-Kirche, Schweringen, a swastika was removed in 2018 
 Winzeln, Pirmasens, Rheinland-Pfalz
 Gossa, Muldestausee Anhalt-Bitterfeld Saxony-Anhalt
 Lößnitz, Erzgebirgskreis, Saxony, carillon of 23 bells

Austria
 Vienna, Sieveringer Pfarrkirche, 1938
 Schloss Wolfpassing, Scheibbs District

References

Hitler Bells
Individual bells